Hypagophytum is a genus of plants in the family Crassulaceae. It includes only the species Hypagophytum abyssinicum, endemic to Eritrea and Ethiopia.

References 

Crassulaceae
Monotypic Saxifragales genera
Crassulaceae genera
Taxa named by Alwin Berger
Taxa named by Christian Ferdinand Friedrich Hochstetter
Taxa named by Achille Richard